Panathinaikos Athlitikos Omilos (literally in English: "Panathenaic Athletic Club" or Panathinaikos A.C.), also known simply as Panathinaikós , is a major Greek multi-sport club based in the City of Athens. Panathinaikos is one of the most successful multi-sport club and one of the oldest clubs in Greece. The name "Panathinaikos" (which can literally be translated as "Panathenaic", which means "of all Athens") was inspired by the ancient work of Isocrates Panathenaicus, where the orator praise the Athenians for their democratic education and their military superiority, which use it for benefit of all Greeks.

It was founded by Giorgos Kalafatis in 1908 as a football club, when he and 40 other athletes decided to break away from Panellinios Gymnastikos Syllogos following the club's decision to discontinue its football team. It is amongst the most popular clubs in the country and one of the biggest worldwide, based on the number of its sports departments. It is the club that introduced in Greece a number of sports, as it was the first, or amongst the first teams, in football, basketball, volleyball, field hockey, table tennis and handball, while they were also pioneer in the creation of women's teams in basketball and football.

Panathinaikos' teams and individual athletes have won numerous titles and have made notable participations in domestic and international competitions. The basketball and football teams of the club are the most successful Greek teams in terms of achievements in the European competitions. The football team of Panathinaikos is the only Greek team that has reached the UEFA Champions League final (in 1971) and also the semi-finals twice (in 1985 and 1996). It is also the only Greek football team that has played for the Intercontinental Cup. The basketball team of the club is the most successful in Greece and one of the most successful in Europe, with six European championships, one Intercontinental Cup and two Triple Crowns. The teams of Panathinaikos have played overall in 15 European and international finals (in football, basketball, men's volleyball and women's volleyball).

In the individual sports, Panathinaikos has a remarkable tradition in the athletics, cycling, shooting, fencing and boxing departments. It has produced numerous athletes; World champions and European champions, winners at the Olympic, Mediterranean and Balkan Games.

History

1908–1945

Football Club of Athens

Football made its appearance in Greece at the end of the 19th century. In 1908, a young athlete of Panellinios, Giorgos Kalafatis, dismayed by his club's decision to discontinue its football team, left with 40 other athletes and founded "Podosferikos Omilos Athinon" (Football Club of Athens). Konstantinos Tsiklitiras, the great Greek athlete of the early 20th century, played as goalkeeper for the new team.

Panathenaic Athletic Club
The team of Kalafatis was renamed to Panellinios Podosferikos Omilos (PPO) – i.e. "Panhellenic Football Club" – in 1911. In 1918, it was decided that the official crest of the club would be the trifolium, symbol of unity, harmony, nature, and good luck, an idea of player Michalis Papazoglou. The officials of the club were looking for a universal, non-nationalistic or localistic symbol, aiming to represent the whole Athens at the country and further at the world.

Papazoglou was also the main instigator of the Panathenaic Idea, the idea for the creation of a new club -for the Greek standards- which will participate in as more sports as possible (something that would by adopted later by all the major Greek clubs). With the help of the others of the leading four of the club (Kalafatis, Panourgias and Nikolaidis), this came true. In 1919, Kalafatis was a member of the Greece national football team that participated in the Inter-Allied Games in Paris. There, he collected informations also about basketball and volleyball (sports unknown then in Greece) and after his return to Athens, started his efforts on creating new teams for the club.

In 1924, the club took its final and current name "Panathinaikos Athlitikos Omilos (PAO)" (Panathenaic Athletic Club), from now on a multi-sports club. During the next decades, with main contributor Apostolos Nikolaidis (considered Patriarch of the club), Panathinaikos not only will create teams almost in every sport, but they will be consecutive champions for many years in most of them.

The athletics department was founded in 1919. In the same year, Panathinaikos was one of the first clubs in Greece to form a volleyball team. The first dynamic presence of the team is dated back in the years 1927–1929 with many popular players of the time such as the historical member of the board Apostolos Nikolaidis as well as Athanasios Aravositas, Goumas, Arg. Nikolaidis, Papageorgiou and Papastefanou.

In 1922, the basketball department was founded, also one of the first in Greece, and it has since developed into the most successful basketball team in the country and one of the most successful in Europe. In 1924, the table tennis department was founded, in 1926 the tennis department and in 1928 the cycling, shooting and field hockey departments. The swimming, water polo and handball departments were created in 1930.

In the 1928 Summer Olympics, for the first time, the parade of nations started with Greece. The athlete of Panathinaikos Antonis Kariofillis became the first Greek who started the parade.

Panathinaikos won the football championship in 1930 under the guidance of József Künsztler with Angelos Messaris as the team's star player. Other notable players of the era were Antonis Migiakis, Diomidis Symeonidis and Mimis Pierrakos. They beat rivals Olympiacos 8–2, a result that still remains the biggest win either team has achieved against its rival. In 1937 the women's basketball team was created, being the first in the country.

During World War II and the dark years of the Axis occupation of Greece, the athletes of Panathinaikos played a significant role. The football player Mimis Pierrakos was killed during the Greco-Italian war, while Michalis Papazoglou with Dimitris Giannatos (founding member of the basketball team) later participated in the resistance group of Jerzy Iwanow-Szajnowicz, an athlete of Polish origin of Iraklis Thessaloniki and secret agent of the British, and succeeded in destroying three German airplanes and sinking three small warships. They were arrested, tortured and finally Giannatos and Ivanof were executed.

1946–1990 

After the war, the boxing department was re-founded in 1946, the diving department was created in 1947, the weightlifting department in 1959, the chess department in 1960, the fencing department was re-founded in 1960, the gymnastics department in 1962, the waterskiing department in 1963 and a wrestling department in 1965.

Panathinaikos' hardcore fans are called Gate 13 and are the oldest union of supporters in Greece. Gate 13 was founded in 1966. Furthermore, in the 1966 European Athletics Championships, the pole vaulter of the club and 13 times Greek champion, Christos Papanikolaou, won the silver medal.

The volleyball club has demonstrated many titles and honours due to the fact that the team roster has always included some of the top volleyball players in Greece. The first generation was that of the 1960s with Andreas and Nikos Bergeles as well as Iliopoulos, Leloudas, Chasapis, Emmanouel, Perros and Fotiou who opened the road for the next generations.

In 1970, Christos Papanikolaou jumped  to capture the world record.

Panathinaikos soon dominated Greek football along with rivals Olympiacos and AEK and, although they are second in domestic titles, they have done better than any other Greek club in the European competitions. In 1971, Panathinaikos became the first and only Greek team – so far – to have reached the final of a European competition, when they faced Ajax in Wembley Stadium for the European Cup, losing 2–0. In the late 1970s, when football became professional in Greece, the club's football department passed to the hands of the Vardinogiannis family. In the following 30 years the team won the Greek championship 7 times, while in Europe the team reached also the semi-finals of the UEFA Champions League two more times, in 1985 and 1996.

In 1974, the table tennis team reached the semi-finals of the ETTU Cup. In 1978, the modern pentathlon department was founded and in 1980, the judo department. An important achievement for the volleyball team was the participation in the final of the CEV Cup Winners' Cup in 1980. During the following years, Panathinaikos continued to perform well in Greek volleyball with players such as Kazazis, Tentzeris, Gontikas (later president of Panathinaikos F.C.), Galakos, Dimitriadis and Margaronis.

The archery department was founded in 1981 and a futsal department in 1990.

1991–2000 

Another successful period for the volleyball team was the seasons 1994–95 and 1995–96 when Panathinaikos won two Greek Championships in a row with Stelios Prosalikas as head coach and Andreopoulos, Triantafyllidis, Filippov, Spanos, Chatziantoniou, Ouzounov, A. Kovatsev, S. Kovatsev, Karamaroudis and Tonev as players.

The men's basketball department became professional in 1992 and since then is owned by two pharmaceutical magnates, the brothers Pavlos and Thanassis Giannakopoulos. In 1996 in Paris final-four (F4), Panathinaikos was the first Greek team to win a European Champions' Cup (now called Euroleague), beating Barcelona in a unique final, by 67–66. In September of the same year the team also won the Intercontinental Cup, prevailing by 2–1 wins over Olimpia of Argentina (83–89, 83–78, 101–76). In the same year, the football team reached the UEFA Champions League semi-finals.

In 2000, in the F4 of Thessaloniki, Panathinaikos were the Champions of Europe for the second time, beating Maccabi 73–67 in the final. In 2002 in Bologna, they conquered the most prestigious European trophy for the third time, beating hosts Kinder Bologna 89–83. Also, in 2000, the women's volleyball team reached the CEV Cup final.

2001–present 

In 2007 in Athens F4, Panathinaikos BC were crowned European Champions for the fourth time, beating CSKA Moscow 93–91. In 2009 in Berlin, the "greens" defeated again CSKA 73–71 to become the Champions of Europe for the fifth time.

In 2009, the men's volleyball team reached the CEV Cup final, while the women's volleyball team reached the Challenge Cup final.

The sixth Euroleague triumph for Panathinaikos BC came in Barcelona in 2011, after defeating Maccabi 78–70 in the final. Panathinaikos BC became so, the second most successful club (behind Real Madrid) in the history of the competition.

In 2013, a new sports department was founded for the first time after many years. It is the rugby team, which was announced on 7 November 2013, while the re-foundation of the field hockey department and the creation also of a baseball team was announced in 2014.

On 29 December 2016, following the current trend of sports clubs getting involved in electronic sports, the club announces the establishment of an eSports section.

In December 2018, Panathinaikos proceeded to the foundation of Wheelchair Basketball department.

Crest 

In 1918, Michalis Papazoglou proposed the trifolium as emblem of Panathinaikos, symbol of harmony, unity, nature, and good luck. Georgios Chatzopoulos, member of the club (later President) and director of the National Gallery, took over to design the emblem for the club. Up to the end of the 1970s, a trifolium (green or white) was sewed on the heart's side on the jersey of the club΄s teams.

With the beginning of professionalism in the Greek football, the crest of the FC was created, accompanied by the club initials and the year of founding (1908). The basketball team uses also since 1992 its own logo.

In 2014, the direction of the club introduced a separate crest for the whole club and all the amateur departments.

Crest evolution

Description and major titles of the professional departments

Panathinaikos men's football 

Football is the first and oldest department of the club. The football team of Panathinaikos is the only Greek that has reached the UEFA Champions League final (in 1971) and semi-finals (in 1985 and 1996), such as the Intercontinental Cup final.

Super League Greece: (20): 1930, 1949, 1953, 1960, 1961, 1962, 1964, 1965, 1969, 1970, 1972, 1977, 1984, 1986, 1990, 1991, 1995, 1996, 2004, 2010
Greek Football Cup: (19): 1940, 1948, 1955, 1967, 1969, 1977, 1982, 1984, 1986, 1988, 1989, 1991, 1993, 1994, 1995, 2004, 2010, 2014, 2022
Greek Super Cup: (3) (record): 1988, 1993, 1994,
Greater Greece Cup: (1): 1970
Balkans Cup: (1): 1977

Panathinaikos men's basketball 

Founded in 1919, the basketball team of the club is the most successful in Greece and one of the most successful in Europe, with six European championships and one Intercontinental Cup. Panathinaikos' basketball department is also the only team in Europe to have won at least one trophy for 24 straight seasons, from 1996 to 2019.

Greek Championship: (39) (record): 1946, 1947, 1950, 1951, 1954, 1961, 1962, 1967, 1969, 1971, 1972, 1973, 1974, 1975, 1977, 1980, 1981, 1982, 1984, 1998, 1999, 2000, 2001, 2003, 2004, 2005, 2006, 2007, 2008, 2009, 2010, 2011, 2013, 2014, 2017, 2018, 2019, 2020, 2021
Greek Cup: (20) (record): 1979, 1982, 1983, 1986, 1993, 1996, 2003, 2005, 2006, 2007, 2008, 2009, 2012, 2013, 2014, 2015, 2016, 2017, 2019, 2021
European Championship: (6) (Greek record): 1996, 2000, 2002, 2007, 2009, 2011
Intercontinental Cup: (1): 1996

Panathinaikos men's volleyball 
The volleyball department was founded in 1919. it is one of the oldest and most successful volleyball teams in Greece.

Greek Championship: (20): 1963, 1965, 1966, 1967, 1970, 1971, 1972, 1973, 1975, 1977, 1982, 1984, 1985, 1986, 1995, 1996, 2004, 2006, 2020, 2022
Greek Cup: (6): 1982, 1984, 1985, 2007, 2008, 2010
Greek League Cup: (2): 2020, 2022
Greek Super Cup: (2): 2006, 2022

Description and major titles of the amateur departments

Panathinaikos women's basketball
The department was founded in 1937, the first in the country.
 
Greek Championship: (5): 1998, 2000, 2005, 2013, 2021
Greek Cup: (1): 2000

Panathinaikos women's volleyball
The department was founded in 1969 and is the women's volleyball team with more trophies in Greece.
 
Greek Championship: (24) (record): 1971, 1972, 1973, 1977, 1978, 1979, 1982, 1983, 1985, 1988, 1990, 1991, 1992, 1993, 1998, 2000, 2005, 2006, 2007, 2008, 2009, 2010, 2011, 2022
Greek Cup: (6): 2005, 2006, 2008, 2009, 2010, 2022

Individual sports

Panathinaikos athletics 

The athletics department was founded in 1919. The first athletes were the football players of the club.

 Greek Championship, Men: (23): 1955, 1956, 1957, 1958, 1959, 1960, 1961, 1962, 1963, 1964, 1965, 1966, 1967, 1968, 1969, 1970, 1971, 1972, 1973, 1974, 1977, 1989, 1990
 Greek Indoor Championship, Men: (4): 1986, 1989, 1990, 2023
 Greek Cross Country Championship, Men: (27) (record):  1930, 1931, 1932, 1933, 1934, 1938, 1954, 1955, 1956, 1968, 1969, 1970, 1971, 1972, 1973, 1974, 1975, 1977, 1978, 1979, 1980, 1983, 1996, 1997, 2012, 2016, 2021
 Greek Championship, Women: (3): 1946, 1947, 1949
 Greek Indoor Championship, Women: (1): 2023
 Greek Cross Country Championship, Women: (8): 1949, 1950, 1983, 1984, 1985, 1986, 2017, 2022

Panathinaikos cycling 
Founded in 1928, it is one of the most successful departments of Panathinaikos.

 Greek Championship, Overall Standings: (8): 1951, 1956, 1958, 1963, 1967, 1969, 1970, 1973
 Greek Championship, Track Standings Men: (1): 2017

Panathinaikos table tennis 

The department was founded in 1924 by Nikos Mantzaroglou.

 Greek Clubs' Championship, Men: (11): 1951, 1952, 1955, 1956,1959, 1960, 1961, 1962, 1966, 1968, 1975
 Greek Clubs' Championship, Women: (3): 1972, 1973, 1974
 Greek Cup, Men: (3): 1965,1966, 1969
 Greek Cup, Women: (2): 1972, 2022
 ETTU Europe Trophy, Women: 2022

Panathinaikos boxing 
It was founded in 1912 by John Cyril Campbell, the coach of the football team.

 Greek Championship, Men: (32) (record): 1949, 1950, 1951, 1952, 1954, 1955, 1957, 1958, 1959, 1960, 1964, 1966, 1967, 1968, 1969, 1971, 1972, 1973, 1974, 1975, 1976, 1977, 1982, 1986, 1992, 1993, 1996, 1997, 1998, 2011, 2015, 2016

Panathinaikos fencing 
Just like the boxing department, it was founded in 1912 by John Cyril Campbell, the coach of the football team.

 Greek Championship, Overall Standings: (13): 1963, 1964, 1965, 1966, 1967, 1968, 1969, 1970, 1971, 1972, 1973, 1974, 1975

Panathinaikos archery 
 Greek Championship, Men: (3): 1983, 1984, 1985, 2018

Panathinaikos shooting 
 Greek Championship, bullseye shooting: (8): 1960, 1964, 1982, 1983, 1984, 1989, 1990, 1991
 Greek Championship, clay target: (1): 2021

Panathinaikos diving 
 Greek Championship, Overall Standings: (6): 1969, 1972, 1975, 2015, 2016, 2017

Panathinaikos swimming 
 Greek Championship, Overall Standings: (12): 1951, 1952, 1953, 1954, 1955, 1956, 1958, 1963, 1964, 1965, 1966, 1968
 Greek Masters Championship: (3) (Greek record): 2018, 2019, 2021

Panathinaikos weightlifting 
 Greek Championship, Overall Standings: (1): 2019
 Greek Championship, Men: (5): 1964, 1965, 1966, 1967, 1968

Panathinaikos modern pentathlon 
 Greek Championship, Men: (2): 1980, 1987

Panathinaikos wrestling 
 Greek Championship, Men: (2): 2014, 2015
Panathinaikos chess
 Greek Championship: (2): 1970,1971

Titles of inactive departments

Panathinaikos gymnastics 
 Greek Championship, Men: (1): 1972

Notable athletes 
 Football: Antonis Antoniadis, Stratos Apostolakis, Marcus Berg, Juan José Borrelli, Djibril Cisse, Mimis Domazos, Kostas Frantzeskos, Mijat Gacinovic, Ezequiel González, Takis Ikonomopoulos, Giorgos Kalafatis, Anthimos Kapsis, Giorgos Karagounis, Michalis Konstantinou, Giannis Kyrastas, Sebastián Leto, Kostas Linoxilakis, Takis Loukanidis, Angelos Messaris, Antonis Migiakis, Lakis Petropoulos, Juan Ramón Rocha, Dimitris Saravakos, Giourkas Seitaridis, Paulo Sousa, Gilberto Silva, Juan Ramón Verón, Krzysztof Warzycha, Velimir Zajec, Vasilis Konstantinou
 Basketball: Men: Fragiskos Alvertis, Liveris Andritsos, Michael Batiste, Dejan Bodiroga, Fanis Christodoulou, Dimitris Diamantidis, Nikos Galis, Panagiotis Giannakis, James Gist, Mike James, Šarūnas Jasikevičius, Robertas Javtokas, Giorgos Kolokithas, Apostolos Kontos, Jaka Lakovič, Faidon Matthaiou, Nikola Peković, Željko Rebrača, Byron Scott, Hugo Sconochini, Ramūnas Šiškauskas, David Stergakos, Dejan Tomašević, Kostas Tsartsaris, Dominique Wilkins Women: Dimitra Kalentzou, Jacki Gemelos, Dora Panteli
 Volleyball: Men: Liberman Agamez, Dante Amaral, Marcelo Elgarten, Hernando Gomez, Fernando Hernandez, Andre Nascimento, Clayton Stanley, Gerasimos Theodoratos, Paweł Zagumny Women: Ruxandra Dumitrescu, Xanthi Milona, Effrosyni Sfyri
 Athletics: Men: Rigas Efstathiadis, Antonis Kariofilis, Giannis Lambrou, Apostolos Nikolaidis, Michalis Papazoglou, Christos Papanikolaou, Konstantinos Poulios, Georgios Roubanis, Antonis Tritsis Women: Hrysopiyi Devetzi, Alexandra Papageorgiou
 Swimming: Romanos Alyfantis, Marianna Lymperta, Nery Mantey Niangkouara
 Boxing: Giannis Aidiniotis, Vangelis Ikonomakos, Dimitris Michael, Areti Mastrodouka
 Fencing: Panagiotis Dourakos, Ioannis Hatzisarantos, Andreas Vgenopoulos, Despina Georgiadou
 Cycling: Ilias Kelesidis
 Table Tennis: Nikos Mantzaroglou, Kostas Priftis
 Shooting: Athanasios Aravositas, Georgios Liveris, Georgios Marmaridis, Konstantinos Mylonas, Alkiviadis Papageorgopoulos

Supporters

According to the most recent polls, Panathinaikos is one of the most popular clubs in Greece, with nearly 30,2% of the fans supporting them, and the most popular in greater Athens and the region of Attica. They have also a large fanbase in all Greek prefectures, in Cyprus and in the Greek diaspora. They have the largest fanbase among high educated people and the Greek upper class (traditionally representing the old Athenian society), while they are popular among middle and lower class also.

The main organized supporters of Panathinaikos are known as Gate 13 (est. 1966), which consists of around 80 clubs alongside Greece and Cyprus. Gate 13 style of supporting includes the use of green fireworks, large and small green flags, displaying of banners and especially the creation of colourful and large choreographies, noisy and constant cheering and other supporters stuff. Gate 13 has over the years become a part of the club by affecting club decisions and by following the club on all occasions. PALEFIP (Panhellenic club of Panathinaikos friends) is the other major supporters organization. Panathinaikos F.C. currently is the only supporter-owned football club in Greece.

Panathinaikos supporters hold both records of the most season tickets sales (31.091 in 2010) and highest average attendance for a unique season (44.942 in 1985–86 season) in the history of Greek football.

Regarding the basketball, the fans of Panathinaikos, notable for their passionate support, also hold continuous attendance European records, such as the 20,000 fans against Benetton Treviso in 2006 and the 30,000 (over 25.000 officially) viewers against FC Barcelona Bàsquet in 2013.

The club is quite popular among artist cycles (actors, musicians, singers etc.), as well as some notable politicians.

Notable supporters 

 Sophia Aliberti, actress
 Giannis Bostantzoglou, actor
 Giannis Diakogiannis, sports journalist
 Giorgos Chatzinasios, composer
 Giannis Fertis, actor
 Petros Filipidis, actor
 Giorgos Fountas, actor
 Katerina Gogou, actress and anarchist poet
 Giannis Haroulis, singer
 Dimitris Horn, actor
 Liana Kanelli, journalist and member of the Greek Parliament
 Kostas Karafotis, singer
 Kostas Karamanlis, former Prime Minister of Greece
 George Karlaftis, NFL player
 Nikos Karvelas, songwriter, producer and singer
 Giorgos Katsaros, musician and songwriter
 Nikos Kourkoulos, actor
 Stamatis Kokkotas, singer
 Alexandros Lykourezos, lawyer
 Lavrentis Machairitsas, rock musician
 Zeta Makripoulia, model, actress and TV presenter
 Spyridon Merkouris, Mayor of Athens

 Stamatis Mercouris, politician and military officer
 Melina Mercouri, actress
 Andreas Mikroutsikos, songwriter, singer and TV presenter
 Thanos Mikroutsikos, composer 
 Vicky Moscholiou, singer
 Klelia Pantazi, rhythmic gymnast and Olympic medal winner
 Aleka Papariga, former General Secretary of the Communist Party of Greece
 Yiannis Parios, singer and songwriter
 Nikos Pateras, shipowner
 Georgios Rallis, former Prime Minister of Greece
 Giannis Spaliaras, male model
 Marianna Toumasatou, actress
 Pavlos Tsimas, journalist
 Alexis Tsipras, leader of Coalition of the Radical Left and the current Prime Minister of Greece
 Theodoros Veniamis, shipowner and president of the Greek Union of Shipowners
 Anna Vissi, singer
 Aliki Vougiouklaki, actress
 Nikos Xilouris, composer and singer of Cretan music
 Giorgos Zambetas, musician
 Yannis Zouganelis, musician/comedian

Gold trifolium
The Gold trifolium of Panathinaikos AC is the major club's award given to special personalities. According to sources it has been awarded to:

 Jack Nikolaidis, club's official and president
 Željko Obradović, basketball coach

 Nikolaos Plastiras, military officer and PM

European and worldwide honours

Gallery

See also 
 List of Panathinaikos AO presidents
 List of Panathinaikos F.C. presidents
 Sport in Greece

References 

 Panathinaikos 1908–1998 by Panos Fiamengos
 Mia zoi Panathinaikos IDEV S.A. Publications, Athens 1985
 Hellenic General Secretariat for Sports
 Wembley 1971

External links 

 

 
Multi-sport clubs in Athens
Sports clubs in Athens